Lilaeopsis brasiliensis is a plant species in the family Apiaceae.

Common names
Micro sword.

Synonyms
Craztzia brasiliensis
Commonly sold as L. novae-zelandiae - a true species from New Zealand but it doesn't yet seem to have been introduced into the aquarium trade.

Origins
Found in South America.

Description
A short-stemmed plant with pale green leaves that in the right conditions form a short carpet. Reaches a height of about 1.5 - 3 inches (4 - 7 cm).

Cultivation
Used in the foreground of the aquarium. To grow well it needs a very bright light, and a tropical temperature range. It prefers a good substrate, a nutrient rich water and will benefit from additional . According to Tropica it will tolerate some salt in the water. Slow growing.

Propagates from runners which are readily formed but it can take some time to form the mat effect desired in planted aquariums.

References
 Affolter, J. M. 1985. A monograph of the genus Lilaeopsis (Umbelliferae). Syst. Bot. Monogr. 6:38.

External links
 Tropica
 AquaHobby
 Aquarium Journal

brasiliensis
Aquatic plants
Plants described in 1985